

List of representatives
Haruo Okada, Socialist Party of Japan, 1947, 1949, 1952, 1953, 1955, 1958, 1960, 1963, 1967, 1972, 1976, 1979, 1980, 1983
Tadashi Kodaira, Socialist then Social Democratic, 1949・1953・1955・1958・1963・1967・1969・1972・1976・1979・1983
Seiichi Ikehata, Social Democratic Party, 1976–1979, 1983–1996
Shōichi Watanabe, Liberal Democratic Party, 1979, 1980, 1983, 1986, 1990, 1993
Tatsuo Takahashi, Liberal Democratic Party, 1979–1990, 1993–1996
Yukio Hatoyama, Liberal Democratic Party until 1993, New Party Sakigake, 1986–1996
Tadamasa Kodaira, Social Democratic Party, 1990–1996

Election results
1993 Japanese general election
Yukio Hatoyama, New Party Sakigake, 111,824 votes
Tatsuo Takahashi, Liberal Democratic Party, 81,334 votes
Seiichi Ikehata, Social Democratic Party, 73,433 votes
Shōichi Watanabe, Liberal Democratic Party, 73,410 votes
Tadamasa Kodaira, Social Democratic Party, 71,993 votes
1990 Japanese general election
Seiichi Ikehata, Social Democratic Party, 102,553 votes
Yukio Hatoyama, Liberal Democratic Party, 85,516 votes
Tadamasa Kodaira, Social Democratic Party, 85,210 votes
Shōichi Watanabe, Liberal Democratic Party, 81,793 votes
1986 Japanese general election
Tatsuo Takahashi, Liberal Democratic Party, 100,297 votes
Yukio Hatoyama, Liberal Democratic Party, 93,001 votes
Seiichi Ikehata, Social Democratic Party, 87,603 votes
Shōichi Watanabe, Liberal Democratic Party, 84,626 votes
1983 Japanese general election
Shōichi Watanabe, Liberal Democratic Party, 77,696 votes
1980 Japanese general election
Shōichi Watanabe, Liberal Democratic Party, 77,918 votes
1979 Japanese general election
Shōichi Watanabe, Liberal Democratic Party, 74,002 votes
1976 Japanese general election
1972 Japanese general election
1967 Japanese general election
1963 Japanese general election
1960 Japanese general election
1958 Japanese general election
1955 Japanese general election
1953 Japanese general election
1952 Japanese general election
1949 Japanese general election
1947 Japanese general election

Politics of Hokkaido
History of Hokkaido
Districts of the House of Representatives (Japan)